Pazhassiraja College, Pulpally, Sultan Bathery, Wayanad is a first grade college affiliated to Calicut University.

History
Pazhassi Raja College, Pulpally, was started in the year 1982 to cater to the higher education needs of the community in this locality and the surrounding places in Wayanad district. Wayanad is a remotely situated tribal district in Kerala. The College had a humble beginning on 20 October 1982 with two Pre-degree batches. The early times of the college were miserable. It was Incorporated in 1983. Fighting against all the odds, the college started with only 127 students, seven teachers, and eight office staff, and the first Principal Dr. O. Sooryanaryanan who came from Government Brennen College, Thalassery. The Society struggled a lot to get a suitable land for this College, and finally, they bought this piece of land of about fifteen acres, just 1.5 kilometers away from the zero points of Pulpally. The first Management of the College handed over the ownership of the college to the Bathery Diocese of the Syro-Malankara Catholic Church, and the latter took over the college in July 1992. The first patron of the college was Bishop Dr. Cyril Baselios, the first Bishop of the Bathery Diocese. The present Manager and Patron of our college are Bishop Dr. Joseph Mar Thomas, who retired as Principal from the Mar Theophilos Training College, Trivandrum, and a renowned Economist and Educationist.

Departments

 Travel & Tourism Management
 History
 English
 Economics
 Microbiology
 Biochemistry
 Journalism & Mass Communication
 Vocational Studies
 Commerce
 Computer Applications
 Malayalam
 Hindi
 Mathematics
 Political Science
 Physical Education

Courses
UG PROGRAMS:

 BA Economics
 BA History
 Bachelor of Travel & Tourism Management
 Bachelor of Business Administration
 BSc Microbiology
 BA English
 BA Mass Communication
 BSc Biochemistry

PG PROGRAMS:

 MA Journalism & Mass Communication
 M.Com
 MA Economics
 MSc Microbiology
 MSc Biochemistry
 MTTM Travel & Tourism Management

B.VOC. PROGRAMS:

 B.Voc. Food Science
 B.Voc. Agriculture

OTHER PROGRAMS:

 UGC Add-on Courses
 Diploma in Computer Application
 Diploma in Cosmetology & Beauty Parlour Management

Notable alumni
 Shruthi Rajanikanth, Actress

See also
Education in India
Education in Kerala
St Mary's College, Sulthan Bathery
List of institutions of higher education in Kerala
List of colleges affiliated to the University of Calicut

References

External links 
Pazhassiraja College
University of Calicut
University Grants Commission
National Assessment and Accreditation Council

Syro-Malankara Catholic Church
Christian universities and colleges in India
Colleges affiliated with the University of Calicut
1983 establishments in Kerala